Vivants is French for the living.

Vivants, Vivantes, Vivant, Vivante, or variation, may refer to:

People
 Vivant Denon (1747–1825), French artist and statesman
 Pierre Abel Clarin Vivant (1855–1914), French historian and journalist
 Arturo Vivante (1923–2008), Italian-American author

Groups, organizations, companies
 Vivant, Belgian political party
 Vivantes Hospital Group, Berlin, Germany
 Vivante Corporation, U.S. fabless semiconductor company

Other uses
 Chevrolet Vivant, a compact MPV/minivan
 Vivante (album), a 2021 album by Amel Bent

See also

 Abbey of Saint Vivant, origin of the AOC Romanée-Saint-Vivant
 
 
 
 
 
 Survivants (disambiguation)